Vettai is a 2012 Indian Tamil-language action thriller film co produced, written and directed by N. Linguswamy. The film stars Arya, Madhavan, Sameera Reddy, and Amala Paul while Ashutosh Rana, Thambi Ramaiah and Nassar played supporting roles. The film score is composed by Yuvan Shankar Raja, while cinematography is by Nirav Shah and editing handled by Anthony.

The film revolves around two brothers, the elder being sensitive to violence and the younger being a jobless rogue, and is set in Thoothukudi. After the death of their father, a police officer, the elder brother takes on the same job by request of the younger. The older brother rises to fame in his job by having his younger brother secretly punish suspects and save victims for him.

The film was announced shortly after the release of Lingusamy's Paiyaa, with Dhayanidhi Alagiri's Cloud Nine Movies agreeing to produce the film, following a successful collaboration during the director's previous film. During a lengthy pre-production phase, the film underwent major changes in its main cast and Cloud Nine Movies stepped out of the project, with Linguswamy's own banner, Thirupathi Brothers, taking up the film. Filming was initially planned to begin by mid-2010, but was delayed until March 2011. The film was released on 14 January 2012, coinciding with Pongal festival.

It is remade in Telugu as Tadakha in 2013 directed by Kishore Kumar Pardasani. Tarang Cine Productions remade the movie in Odia in 2018 as Happy Lucky. It was remade in Marathi as Mauli in 2018 directed by Aditya Sarpotdar. In Hindi as Baaghi 3 in 2020 directed by Ahmed Khan. It was also remade in Bangladeshi as Hitman in 2014.

Plot
Thirumurthy and Gurumurthy are two brothers in Thoothukudi, with Thirumurthy, being sensitive to violence, in contrast to Gurumurthy, who is brave and clever. Whenever Thirumurthy is thrashed by anyone, he sends Gurumurthy to finish them. However, Gurumurthy is frequently berated by his father Lingamurthy, a police officer for beating local people, while Thirumurthy only feels for him.

After the death of Lingamurthy, The now grown-up Thirumurthy takes on the same police job by the request of Gurumurthy, who remains an unemployed youngster. Thirumurthy is posted as SI in Thoothukudi. Meanwhile, Thirumurthy falls in love with Vasanthi and Gurumurthy falls for her younger sister Jayanthi. Subsequently, Thirumurthy marries Vasanthi, and both the brothers shift to Vasanthi and Jayanthi's house. A number of humorous incidents follow, such as Jayanthi's to-be husband is actually revealed to be a clumsy NRI named Gautham, whom she disapproves. She openly expresses her love for Gurumurthy, who accepts.

Thirumurthy rises to fame in his job by having Gurumurthy secretly punish suspects and save victims for him. Everyone believes that Thirumurthy actually fought the criminals himself, but in reality, he took credit for Gurumurthy's doings, unknown to them. One of the village's biggest mob bosses, Annachi, discovers the truth via a CCTV showing Gurumurthy. Enraged, he has his men severely beat up Thirumurthy, making the latter confident that his brother will continue his job. Gurumurthy proclaims that he made Thirumurthy as a policeman to overcome his fears and become stronger. Following his recovery, Thirumurthy begins training under Gurumurthy and subsequently overcomes his fear and manages to defeat a few of Annachi's men and tactically, with Gurumurthy's help, kill Maari, the goon responsible for beating him up.

Eventually, Annachi and his men break into the brothers's house and cause havoc. Thirumurthy and Gurumurthy arrive and defeat all of Annachi's men; however, they are unable to beat Annachi. When Annachi falls for a trap set by the brothers, he is defeated, but the two brothers quarrel about whether to kill or arrest him. Gurumurthy declares that they will roll a gun; if the gun stops rolling at the brothers, they will arrest Annachi, but if it stops at Annachi, he will be killed. The gun stops rolling at Annachi, and he tries to grab the gun, but Gurumurthy stops him by kicking him, and Thirumurthy shoots him dead.

Thirumurthy is again congratulated by the local police, but gives equal credit to Gurumurthy as well. Through this praise, Gurumurthy also gets to join the police force.

Cast

 Arya as Gurumurthy
 Madhavan as Inspector Thirumurthy
 Sameera Reddy as Vasanthi Thirumurthy 
 Amala Paul as Jayanthi Gurumurthy 
 Ashutosh Rana as Annachi
 Nagendra Babu as Lingamurthy, Gurumurthy and Thirumurthy's father
 Nassar as SP Veerapandiyan
 Thambi Ramaiah as Constable Azhagu
 Shanmugarajan as Inspector Kulasekara Pandian
 Sreejith Ravi as Surulai
 Soundararaja as Madura
 Muthukumar as Maari
 Rajeev Ravindranathan as NRI Gautham

Production

Development

In April 2010, following the success of Paiyaa, Cloud Nine Movies, who had distributed the film, announced a successive collaboration with the film's director N. Linguswamy, who would make a romantic action film with Silambarasan in the lead role. For pre-production works, the crew of the team subsequently headed to Macau to work out the script, following which Lingusamy moved to the Orange County resort in Coorg, Karnataka to finalise the script. Later that month a photo shoot was completed, with Silambarsan sporting the get up of an NCC cadet, However, in July 2010, reports suggested that Silambarasan was dropped from the project, since he suddenly, without informing Lingusamy and Dhayanidhi, signed himself up and began working in Vaanam (2011). Silambarasan, in return, revealed that he had not officially signed Cloud Nine Pictures' film, and only decided to work on Vaanam, since Lingusamy was not able to narrate the complete script, despite making him wait for over 100 days. Controversially, Silambarasan later signed another film in September 2010, which was similarly titled as Vettai Mannan.

Eventually in September 2010, the film was official announced at a press meet with the title Vettai, with Arya replacing Silambarasan. At the press meet, he revealed that he worked for over three months on the script, keeping his editor Anthony Gonsalvez and cinematographer Nirav Shah updated about the developments. The film's principal photography was initially supposed to commence in June 2010, but due to pre-production works, it got delayed further and was postponed to December. The film was announced as a bilingual project, to be shot separately in Tamil and Telugu. The Telugu version was supposed to be produced by Tirupati Prasad of Mega Supergood Films and feature Mahesh Babu in the lead role, with Madhavan reprising his role. In March 2011, Cloud Nine Movies stepped out of the project, which prompted Linguswamy to produce Vettai, too, under his home banner Thirupathi Brothers along with his brother Subash Chandra Bose.

Casting

After Silambarasan's exit, Vijay was expected to enact the lead role, who had earlier agreed to star in a Lingusamy film in future, and was subsequently approached by the team. He, however, declined the offer, not willing to play a role that was "originally written keeping in mind the image of another actor". Only in September 2010, during the official announcement, it became apparent that Arya was signed on to reprise the lead role. Furthermore, Linguswamy was trying to sign Madhavan for another leading role, while, several days later, sources reported that Madhavan definitely had rejected the offer. The next month, however, it was confirmed that Madhavan was roped in to enact the role as a police officer and brother of Arya's character. Madhavan accepted the film as he was 'blown' away by the story.

The lead female role was reported to be played by Tamannaah Bhatia, who had been part of Linguswamy's Paiyaa as well. In an interview later, she disclosed that she was not approached earlier and though she liked the script, she could not take the offer due to her prior commitments. Anushka Shetty then accepted the offer, while Sameera Reddy was signed to play Madhavan's pair in the film, as a village girl. In late November 2010, Anushka pulled out and Amala Paul, following her critically acclaimed performance in Mynaa, was roped in to play a leading character, as the love interest of Arya's character.

Filming
Originally planned to commence in September 2010, the filming was postponed several times either due to pending pre-production works and unavailability of the artists. After Arya had finished shooting and dubbing for Avan Ivan, the first schedule was planned to begin on 2 March, which however, was also cancelled as Dhayanidhi wanted the filming to be pushed by another two months, which supposedly was the reason for Linguswamy's decision to produce the film himself. Shooting eventually started on 16 March 2011 in Karaikudi, with Madhavan, Arya, Sameera Reddy and Amala Paul participating. A song "Dumma Dumma Dummaa", choreographed by Brindha, was shot first, with nearly 2000 people being part of the shoot along with the four lead actors. A fight sequence, involving Arya and Madhavan, was shot in the Pondicherry University sports complex on 24 April. In June 2011, other key action sequences were filmed at Madurai, Thoothukudi, Thanjavur and Aruppukottai. The introduction song of the film was also shot in Thanjavur. Some action sequences were shot in Madanapalle, a town located in the Chittoor district, Andhra Pradesh, while the climax was shot at Binny Mills in Chennai under the supervision of stunt director Silva. Principal Photography was "Wrap (filmmaking) on October 2011.

Soundtrack

Following successful collaborations with director Linguswamy in Sandakozhi (2005) and Paiyaa (2010), Yuvan Shankar Raja was signed up to produce the film score and soundtrack for Vettai as well. In November 2010, the duo along with lyricist Na. Muthukumar left for Malaysia to compose the first tunes. The soundtrack album was launched on 28 December 2011 at the Anna Centenary Auditorium in Kotturpuram, Chennai, with several lead actors and directors from the Tamil film industry attending the event. Six days prior to the soundtrack release, on 22 December 2011, the song "Pappappa" was launched as a single track at the studios of Radio Mirchi, with a making-of video of the recording being simultaneously uploaded on YouTube. The song, which was sung by Yuvan Shankar Raja himself along with Renu Kannan, a finalist of the second season of the reality-based singing competition Airtel Super Singer, quickly gained attention and became very popular.

Track listing

Reception

Behindwoods said "Vettai has some peppy likeable soundtracks to its credits. Even if it’s not Yuvan's best, Vettai packages all genres of folksy music well. With songs like 'Pappa Pappa' and the romantic 'Kattipudi', the album is all set to turn out to be a commercial winner".

Release
The filmmakers wanted to release the film on 13 January 2012, due to post production delays, the release date was postponed by a day. The movie released on the Pongal weekend on 14 January 2012. Vettai was released in 650 screens worldwide on 14 January 2012 including 300 screens in Tamil Nadu, 250 screens in the rest of India, and about a 100 screens overseas. Vettai sold 4.3 million tickets worldwide.

Reception

Critical reception
Vettai received positive reviews. Behindwoods rated the film 3.5/5 and called it a "light hearted film for the holiday season". Sify'''s critic wrote: "Lingusamy's Vettai is a racy mass entertainer with all the ingredients mixed in the right proposition. No doubt that the director understands the pulse of the common man and has beautifully packaged it with all the essential commercial elements to suit the taste of the masses". Pavithra Srinivasan of Rediff gave 2.5/5 and noted: "Vettai is no classic, but it is good fun." The Times of India wrote: "Though there is nothing new in terms of the story or screenplay, the movie is a fun ride as long as it lasts". Rohit Ramachandran of Nowrunning.com rated it 3/5 stating that "Vettai is regular Kollywood stuff superiorly packaged with insurmountable energy.". Deccan chronicle wrote:"The first half moves fast with unlimited entertainment, while the post-interval portions falls along predicted lines and pace suffers". Hindu wrote:"The story isn't out of the ordinary, but Lingusamy knows where to place twists and how. From Run to Sandakkozhi and now to Vettai, his action ventures, with the exception of Bheema and Ji, have screenplays that sustain the interest of the viewer".

Rachel Saltz of The New York Times wrote: "Vettai partakes of the something-for-everyone formula, mixing the serious — corruption, evil gangs and limb-threatening fights — with the less so: songs, romance and comedy. It entertains without breaking any new ground, though it can also surprise".

Awards and nominations

Remakes
The film's remake rights were sold for  3 crore, to Bellamkonda Suresh. The Telugu version, titled Tadakha, was released in 2013. It was then remade in Dhallywood (Bangladesh) as Hitman (2014), Odia as Happy Lucky (2018), Marathi as Mauli (2018) and Hindi as Baaghi 3'' (2020).

References

External links
 
 

2012 films
Indian action films
Tamil films remade in other languages
Films shot in Andhra Pradesh
Films scored by Yuvan Shankar Raja
Films directed by N. Lingusamy
2010s Tamil-language films
Fictional portrayals of the Tamil Nadu Police
UTV Motion Pictures films
2012 action films